Abudwak is a city located in central Somalia. It is the administrative seat of Abudwak district located in north Galgaduud province. It is mainly inhabited by the Marehan clan, in particular Reer Dalal, Siyad Hussein and other Marehan subclans.

Transportation
Air transportation in Abudwak is served by the Cabudwaak Airport. A major renovation of the facility was launched in 2011, funded by Somali expatriates from the province. The new airport's first scheduled flight departed on 11 October 2012.

Notes

References
Districts of Somalia

Populated places in Galguduud
Galmudug